Mario Fenech (nicknamed "The Maltese Falcon", “Falcon”, or "Muzza"; born 11 November 1961) is a Maltese Australian rugby league personality. He is a former player of the game who had a lengthy career in the New South Wales/Australian Rugby League in the 1980s and 1990s. His favoured position was as hooker, where he represented New South Wales in State of Origin. In his later career, he became a prop-forward. A legendary figure for the South Sydney Rabbitohs, he captained the club for five seasons from 1986 to 1990.

Background
Fenech was living in the Botany region of Sydney at the time of his childhood. His family believed he had the potential to become a great footballer and that his junior team, the Botany Rams, would not allow him to fulfill these aspirations, so then transferred him to the Mascot Juniors club, as many champion South Sydney players of that era were Mascot Juniors.

Rugby league career
Fenech's playing career spanned from 1981 to 1995. He played for the South Sydney Rabbitohs from 1981 to 1990 and had a lengthy rivalry with his opposite number from the Balmain Tigers, Ben Elias. Fenech was a strong runner from dummy half and, given his style and size, almost always attracted a number of defenders intent on halting his progress. He was also renowned for his short temper on the field in the first half of his career and was regularly sin-binned, sent off or suspended for disciplinary breaches, acts of aggression or foul play.

From 1986 to 1990, he captained South Sydney. In 1991, after failing to secure an adequate contract with South Sydney (who were in financial trouble at the time and could only afford to offer him a reduced salary), he moved to the North Sydney Bears and played for them until 1994.  Fenech played in two preliminary final defeats for Norths in 1991 and 1994, with the club being defeated on both occasions by the Canberra Raiders. These losses, in addition to the two preliminary finals matches South Sydney lost as minor-premiers in 1989, meant that Fenech went through his entire career without playing in a grand final.

His departure from Souths caused significant controversy within the Rabbitohs’ organisation with many ordinary members of the club extremely disappointed with the decision to release a club legend. For his part, Fenech later spoke of how he never wanted to leave the Rabbitohs, but that even at age 28 he felt he still had more to offer as a player and therefore signed with Norths. 

In 1995, he moved to Brisbane and ended his career in the inaugural season of new expansion club, the South Queensland Crushers, during which injury and poor form restricted him to just 11 games. After his retirement from the ARL, Fenech represented Malta in a rugby league sevens tournament.

On 5 July 1988, Fenech (playing at hooker) was given the honour of captaining a Prime Minister's XIII side (a team that included past, current or future internationals Mal Meninga, Greg Alexander, Mark Geyer, Gavin Miller, David Gillespie and Glenn Lazarus) against the touring Great Britain Lions. The match, played in wet and muddy conditions at Seiffert Oval in Queanbeyan (near Canberra), saw the Don Furner-coached side defeat the tourists 24–16.

This would be as close as Fenech would go to playing for Australia, although his nickname of “Test Match” stemmed from his habit of competing with such intensity each time he took the field for his club that it was said he treated every game like a Test match. Fenech did start for New South Wales at hooker in the first two games of the 1989 State of Origin series, but a broken hand cost him both his place in the third match of the series and a spot in the Australian touring team which travelled to New Zealand that season, with the role of Kerrod Walters’ deputy going to his Blues replacement David Trewhella.

Post-rugby league career

Since retiring from football, Fenech has been involved in the entertainment industry. In 2001, his book What's Doing? was published. He was a regular contributor (and butt of jokes) on The Footy Show, and has appeared on numerous other TV shows, including Pizza, and made a brief cameo in the rugby league-based film Footy Legends. During his stint on The Footy Show, footage was repeatedly replayed of him being unwittingly hit on the head with a football during a game between the Crushers and the Parramatta Eels in 1995; this clip led to the dubious honour of any inadvertent contact being made between the ball and the head of a player (in any sport, not necessarily rugby league) being dubbed a "Falcon" in the Australian lexicon. In 2022, Fenech's wife Rebecca revealed that Fenech often resented the way he was treated on The Footy Show.

Fenech ran as a local candidate in the City of Randwick in the 2012 New South Wales council election.

In 2016 Fenech revealed that he was suffering from early onset dementia, which he believes to be the result of years of head knocks and concussions suffered during his rugby career. By 2022 he had lost most of his memory of his playing career.

Fenech remains a loyal supporter of the South Sydney Rabbitohs.

References

Sources
Author Profile at penguin.com.au

Article at theage.com.au

External links

1961 births
Living people
Australian people of Maltese descent
Australian rugby league players
Malta national rugby league team players
Maltese emigrants to Australia
New South Wales City Origin rugby league team players
New South Wales Rugby League State of Origin players
North Sydney Bears players
People from Valletta
Rugby league hookers
South Queensland Crushers players
South Sydney Rabbitohs captains
South Sydney Rabbitohs players